
Gmina Grunwald is a rural gmina (administrative district) in Ostróda County, Warmian-Masurian Voivodeship, in northern Poland.

Gmina Grunwald is divided into 19 sołectwos. The villages with the largest population are Gierzwałd, which dates back to the 14th century, and Zybułtowo. Gierzwałd is the administrative seat of the gmina. Unusually the gmina is not named after the seat, but takes its name from the smaller village of Grunwald, because of the historical importance of the Battle of Grunwald of 1410.

Villages
Gmina Grunwald includes the villages and settlements of Dąbrowo, Domkowo, Dylewko, Dylewo, Frygnowo, Gierzwałd, Glądy, Góry Lubiańskie, Grabiczki, Grunwald, Jędrychowo, Kalwa, Kiersztanówko, Kiersztanowo, Kitnowo, Łącko, Lipowa Góra, Łodwigowo, Lubian, Lubianek, Marcinkowo, Mielno, Omin, Pacółtówko, Pacółtowo, Rychnowo, Rychnowska Wola, Rzepki, Stębark, Szczepankowo, Tymawa, Ulnowo, Wróble, Zapieka and Zybułtowo.

Neighbouring gminas
Gmina Grunwald is bordered by the gminas of Dąbrówno, Kozłowo, Olsztynek and Ostróda.

Historical places of interest 
 Post-battle chapel in the fields of Grunwald
 Manor house, farm and park in Grunwald
 14th-century church, cemetery, palace and park in Dylewo
 Methodist church in Gierzwałd
 Church and belfry in Mielno
 Palace in Pacółtów
 Mazurian wooden church, belfry, convent palace park in Rychnowo
 Church in Stębark
 Church in Kiersztanowo
 Granary and barns in Zybułtowo

Natural features 
It contains several lakes, the largest of which are Jezioro Tymawskie, Jezioro Lubień, Jezioro Mielno, Jezioro Wielki Omin and Jezioro Mały Omin.

Natural monuments and nature reserves:
 Dylewo Hills Landscape Park (Park Krajobrazowy Wzgórz Dylewskich)
 Devils Valley (Czarci Jar) with the confluences of the Drwęca river
 Trout cultures in Czarci Jarz and Rychnowska Wola

References
Polish official population figures 2006

External links 
 Grunwald information site
 Ostróda County, Gmina Grunwald (in Polish)
 Culture, Sport and Recreation Centre (GOKSiR) in Gierzwałdz with information on the Battle of Grunwald
 Grunwald Scouts, with qualification for Grunwald Badge

Grunwald
Ostróda County